The Battle of Dachen Archipelago was a struggle between the Nationalists and the Communists for the control of several archipelagos just off the coast of Zhejiang, China, during the Chinese Civil War in the post-World War II era, and it was part of the First Taiwan Strait Crisis.  The PLA targeted and eventually took the Dachen Archipelago, and the other two smaller archipelagos from Nationalists: the Southern Muntjac Archipelago and the Southern Deer Mountain Archipelago.

Prelude
The PLA had already targeted Dachen Archipelago when they attacked Yijiangshan Islands, but the PLA were incapable of simultaneously taking both.  When the PLA bombed Dachen Archipelago during the Battle of Yijiangshan Islands, it was mainly to prevent the Nationalist garrison of Dachen Archipelago from reinforcing Yijiangshan Islands.  In fact, from 1 November 1954 to 4 November 1954, the PLA air force flew 49 sorties to bomb Dachen Archipelago, but none of the 721 bombs dropped hit their intended targets.  On 10 November 1954, the PLA bombers flew 28 sorties and PLA fighters flew 46 sorties in support of the bombers to strike Nationalist warships in the Dachen Archipelago, but only resulted in minor damages of a mere five warships.

The battle

Air raids
After the main battle of the Battle of Yijiangshan Islands had subsided, the PLA immediately turned their attentions to Dachen Archipelago before declaring the Yijiangshan Islands secured.  On 19 January 1955, the first PLA bombing mission specifically targeting Dachen was carried out by combat-hardened aircrew with experience. Due to the previous two unsuccessful PLA bombing missions, the Nationalists believed that this third air raid would be equally inept and were not fully prepared. As a result, the infrastructures on the islands, especially those for communication, were severely damaged. The casualties were minimal, but the local Nationalist garrison was forced to use unencrypted radios to communicate with Taiwan and among themselves.  Since the PLA used Nationalist equipment captured during the Chinese Civil War, they were able to intercept Nationalist communications.

The second wave of attack also occurred on the same day on 19 January 1955. Though the local Nationalist garrison regrouped and set up more effective air defence, the effort was futile because the second wave of attack struck a target completely unexpected by the defenders: the reservoir, which was not considered a military target of any significance. The reservoir was completely destroyed and, without any fresh water supply readily available, it was nearly impossible to defend the archipelago. On 2 February 1955, the PLA air force bombed the Southern Deer Mountain Archipelago.

The Dachen Retreat

After much debate, the Nationalist government in the Republic of China controlling the Dachen and adjacent archipelagos finally agreed with the Americans to hold out until an evacuation could be carried out by the American Navy in February 1955 to Taiwan more than 200 miles to the south.  The decision was made to withdraw on 5 February 1955, and the U.S. Seventh Fleet used 132 boats and 400 aircraft to move 14,500 civilians, 10,000 Republic of China servicemen, and 4,000 guerrilla fighters, along with 40,000 tons of military equipment and supplies from the island.  After the evacuation, the last Flag of the Republic of China in Dachen was lowered by Chiang Ching-kuo, and the Zhejiang province government of the Republic of China was dissolved as Dachen was their last stronghold in the province.

Last phases
After the retreat, Northern Muntjac Island was the first to be taken by the People's Liberation Army on 8 February 1955, and by 12 February 1955, the entire Dachen Archipelago had fallen into the enemy hands.  On 13 February 1955, the entire Southern Muntjac Archipelago was taken by the PLA.

The Nationalists had left a single regiment to garrison the Southern Deer Mountain Archipelago to the south of Dachen Archipelago for a symbolic struggle, and the regiment held out until late February 1955.  The local commander realized the struggle was futile and was unwilling to waste troops in the lost cause, and thus asked and received permission to withdraw.  On 26 February 1955, the People's Liberation Army took the Southern Deer Mountain Archipelago and the battle concluded.

Outcome
For the CCP/CPC, the gaining of these archipelagos eliminated the Nationalist threat to the vital coastal shipping line, and the Nationalist bases to strike coastal regions. However, Kinmen and Matsu were successfully defended.

See also
 List of battles of the Chinese Civil War
 National Revolutionary Army
 History of the People's Liberation Army
 Chinese Civil War
 Chekiang Province, Republic of China

References

Zhu, Zongzhen and Wang, Chaoguang, Liberation War History, 1st Edition, Social Scientific Literary Publishing House in Beijing, 2000,  (set)
Zhang, Ping, History of the Liberation War, 1st Edition, Chinese Youth Publishing House in Beijing, 1987,  (pbk.)
Jie, Lifu, Records of the Liberation War: The Decisive Battle of Two Kinds of Fates, 1st Edition, Hebei People's Publishing House in Shijiazhuang, 1990,  (set)
Literary and Historical Research Committee of the Anhui Committee of the Chinese People's Political Consultative Conference, Liberation War, 1st Edition, Anhui People's Publishing House in Hefei, 1987, 
Li, Zuomin, Heroic Division and Iron Horse: Records of the Liberation War, 1st Edition, Chinese Communist Party History Publishing House in Beijing, 2004, 
Wang, Xingsheng, and Zhang, Jingshan, Chinese Liberation War, 1st Edition, People's Liberation Army Literature and Art Publishing House in Beijing, 2001,  (set)
Huang, Youlan, History of the Chinese People's Liberation War, 1st Edition, Archives Publishing House in Beijing, 1992, 
Liu Wusheng, From Yan'an to Beijing: A Collection of Military Records and Research Publications of Important Campaigns in the Liberation War, 1st Edition, Central Literary Publishing House in Beijing, 1993, 
Tang, Yilu and Bi, Jianzhong, History of Chinese People's Liberation Army in Chinese Liberation War, 1st Edition, Military Scientific Publishing House in Beijing, 1993 – 1997,  (Volum 1), 7800219615 (Volum 2), 7800219631 (Volum 3), 7801370937 (Volum 4), and 7801370953 (Volume 5)

External links
BBC - 1955: US evacuates Pacific islands
Tachen Islands Evacuation History
Pictures of the evacuation
Bank notes and brief history of Tachen between 1949 and 1955 (in Traditional Chinese)

Conflicts in 1955
Battles of the Chinese Civil War
1955 in China
Military history of Zhejiang
January 1955 events in Asia
February 1955 events in Asia
Cross-Strait conflict